Crazyhouse (also known as drop chess, mad chess, reinforcement chess, turnabout chess and schizo-chess) is a chess variant in which captured enemy pieces can be reintroduced, or dropped, into the game as one's own. The drop rule resembles that of shogi; the two games are often compared though no evidence suggests the one developing from the other. Crazyhouse is similar to bughouse chess; however, a game of Crazyhouse involves only two players.

Rules 
The rules of chess apply except for the addition of drops, as explained below.
 A piece that is captured reverses color and goes to the capturing player's reserve, pocket or bank, where it is considered held or in hand. At any time, instead of making a move with a piece on the board, a player can drop one of their held pieces onto an empty square on the board.
 A pawn may not be dropped on the 1st or 8th .
 A pawn that is dropped on its 2nd rank may use its two-square initial advance; a pawn that is dropped on any other rank cannot.
 When a piece that is promoted from a pawn is captured, it enters the opponent's reserve as a pawn.
Unlike in shogi, dropping a pawn on a  containing another pawn of the same color and dropping a pawn to deliver checkmate are both permissible.

Notation 
Crazyhouse's notation system is an extension of the standard algebraic notation. A drop is notated by inserting an at sign between the piece type and the destination square unless the dropped piece is a pawn, in which case only the at sign and the destination square are used. For example, N@d5 means "knight is dropped on d5."

FEN 
There is no standard FEN specification for Crazyhouse. Lichess uses an extended version of FEN, adding a 9th rank as a reserve. Here is an example of Lichess's FEN implementation:
r2qk3/pp2bqR1/2p5/8/3Pn3/3BPpB1/PPPp1PPP/RK1R4/PNNNbpp b - - 89 45

In XBoard/Winboard's notation system, the reserve is given in square brackets following the board position:
r2qk3/pp2bqR1/2p5/8/3Pn3/3BPpB1/PPPp1PPP/RK1R4[PNNNbpp] b - - 89 45

In Chess.com's notation system, the reserve is located after the full-move number.

To keep track of which pieces are promoted, Lichess and XBoard/Winboard use "~" after the letter designation. Chess.com uses the coordinates of the pieces.
r2q1r1k/2p1ppb1/p2p2pp/3P1p2/B6B/2N2NPp/1PP2P1K/3Q3q w - - 0 26 NNBRpr h1

Variations 
Crazyhouse has several related variants:
 Loop Chess: A promoted piece keeps its rank when captured.
 Chessgi (also known as Mad Mate or Neo Chess): A promoted piece keeps its rank when captured. A pawn may be dropped on its 1st rank.

See also 
 Hostage chess, a variant where a player can drop back into play their own previously captured pieces

References

External links 
 Crazyhouse by Fergus Duniho, The Chess Variant Pages
 Scidb a chess database supporting Crazyhouse
 Rules for the variant on Lichess
 Blog post with introduction, theory and more resources

Chess variants